Parodia herteri is a species of cactus in the subfamily Cactoideae. It is endemic to Brazil. It was named for botanist Wilhelm Herter. The first description was in 1936 as Echinocactus herteri by Erich Werdermann. It was described as Parodia herteri in 1987 by Nigel Paul Taylor.

References

Plants described in 1987
Plants described in 1936
herteri